Cleneth Eugene Markland (December 26, 1919 – June 15, 1999) was an American Major League Baseball infielder. Nicknamed "Mousey", he appeared in five games for the Philadelphia Athletics during the outset of the  season, but had a nine-year, 1,169-game career in minor league baseball. He threw and batted right-handed.

Markland's pro career began in 1939 in his hometown Detroit Tigers' organization, but his career was interrupted by four full years of United States Army service during World War II. He returned to baseball in 1946 and, after a stellar 1949 season with the Triple-A Buffalo Bisons—he hit 25 home runs, batted .305, had 95 runs batted in, and was selected as the third baseman on the International League All-Star Team—Markland received his only Major League trial with the 1950 Athletics.

A rookie at age 30, he made his debut April 25 as a late-inning replacement for second baseman Kermit Wahl, and singled in his first big-league at bat against Vic Raschi of the New York Yankees.  He appeared in four more games for the A's, starting three of them at second base, but collected no more hits, although he notched three bases on balls and scored  two runs.

He then returned to the minor leagues for the rest of 1950 and all of 1951 before leaving the game.

References

External links

1919 births
1999 deaths
Baseball players from Detroit
Buffalo Bisons (minor league) players
Dallas Rebels players
Henderson Oilers players
Kansas City Blues (baseball) players
Major League Baseball infielders
Milwaukee Brewers (minor league) players
Philadelphia Athletics players
Springfield Nationals players
Syracuse Chiefs players
Williamsport Grays players
Winston-Salem Twins players
United States Army personnel of World War II